Indoor football may refer to:

American football
Indoor American football, indoor variants of American football

Association football
Indoor soccer, a variant of association football played indoors
Five-a-side football, another variant of association football often played indoors
Futsal, another association football variant played indoors